The plain leaf warbler (Phylloscopus neglectus) is a species of Old World warbler in the family Phylloscopidae.
It is found in Afghanistan, Bahrain, India, Iran, Oman, Pakistan, Russia, Tajikistan, Turkmenistan, United Arab Emirates, and Uzbekistan.

Its natural habitat is temperate forests.

References

plain leaf warbler
Birds of Afghanistan
Birds of Pakistan
plain leaf warbler
Taxonomy articles created by Polbot